"Don't Let Me Be Lonely Tonight" is a song written and performed by American singer-songwriter James Taylor, from his 1972 album One Man Dog. 
The song has been included on three of Taylor's greatest-hits collection albums: Greatest Hits (1976), Classic Songs (1987) and The Best of James Taylor (2003). Taylor re-recorded the song for the 2001 Michael Brecker album Nearness of You: The Ballad Book; this rendition won Taylor the Grammy Award for Best Male Pop Vocal Performance in 2002.

Personnel
James Taylor – lead vocals, acoustic guitar
Danny Kortchmar – electric guitar
Craig Doerge – piano 
Lee Sklar – bass guitar
Russ Kunkel – drums, congas
Michael Brecker – tenor saxophone

Reception
AllMusic reviewer Bill Janovitz wrote that the song is "a stunning example of the Tin Pan Alley-type of jazzy romantic ballad", and that the song's lyrics, about "a betrayed lover who allows his lonely heart to control his head", were unusual in that songs on that theme were usually performed by female artists.

Chart performance
It was released as the lead single from the album, and peaked at No. 14 on the U.S. Billboard Hot 100, reaching its peak position on January 13, 1973.  It also reached No. 3 Easy Listening. In Canada, the song reached No. 18 on the Pop Singles chart and No. 7 AC.

Covers and samples
The song has been recorded by the following artists:
 Johnny Mathis, on Me and Mrs. Jones (1973)
 Liza Minnelli, on The Singer (1973), her best-selling album
 The Isley Brothers, on their platinum-selling album 3 + 3 (1973). This version was done in 12/8 time, with a rhythm and blues feel.
 Nancy Wilson, on Come Get to This (1975)
 Isaac Hayes, on For the Sake of Love (1978), in a 7-minute, funk-infused version with a long instrumental introduction. The instrumental portion has been sampled in songs including "You Keep Leading Me On" by Mona Lisa (1996), "Rhyme No More" by Jay-Z (1997), "It's All Mo' Thug" by Bone Thugs-n-Harmony (1997) and "Lovin You (On My Mind)" by Slim Thug featuring Z-Ro (2013).
 Mary MacGregor, on ...In Your Eyes (1978)
 Scottish band Wet Wet Wet on their debut album Popped in Souled Out (1987)
Brazilian jazz-bossa nova singer Kenia recorded and released her own revival in 1987. 
 Oleta Adams, on Evolution (1992)
 Michael Brecker, on Nearness of You: The Ballad Book (2001)
 Eric Clapton, on Reptile (2001)
 Joe Cocker, on Heart & Soul (2005)
 Euge Groove, on Livin’ Large (2004)
 David Sanborn featuring Lizz Wright on Closer (2005)
 Diane Schuur on Schuur Fire (2005)
 Jazz saxophonist Boney James, on Send One Your Love (2009). Vocals were by Quinn, in a style similar to the Isley Brothers' version. It was released as a single, and was nominated for the Grammy Award for Best Traditional R&B Performance in 2010, losing to Beyoncé's cover of "At Last".
 Garth Brooks, on The Melting Pot album of the compilation box set Blame It All on My Roots: Five Decades of Influences (2013)

Other cover versions
"Don't Let Me Be Lonely Tonight" has also been performed live by artists including George Benson, Pat Metheny, and Earth, Wind & Fire.

References

1972 singles
1973 singles
Songs written by James Taylor
James Taylor songs
The Isley Brothers songs
Isaac Hayes songs
Song recordings produced by Peter Asher
Songs about loneliness
Songs about nights
Grammy Award for Best Male Pop Vocal Performance
Warner Records singles
Epic Records singles